, there are 3,589 museums in China, including 3,054 state-owned museums (museums run by national and local government or universities) and 535 private museums. With a total collection of over 20 million items, these museums hold more than 8,000 exhibitions every year and 160 million people visits. Some museums of cultural relics, such as the Museum of Qin Terracotta Warriors and Horses in Xi'an, have become internationally known tourist attractions. The government has exchanges of cultural relics exhibitions between museums and promotes the display and exchanges of legal non-governmental collections. The museums are classified into several grades, with the national first-grade museums being the highest classification.

List

Below is a list of museums in China grouped by the provinces or municipalities where they are located.

Anhui
Anhui Provincial Museum
Anhui Hall of Fame
Anhui Paleontology Fossil Museum
Bengbu Museum
China Huizhou Tax Museum
Ma'anshan Museum
She County Museum

Beijing
Beijing Ancient Architecture Museum
Beijing Folk Arts Museum
Beijing Liao and Jin City Wall Museum
Beijing Museum of Contemporary Art
Beijing Museum of Natural History
Beijing Planning Exhibition Hall
Capital Museum
China Agricultural Museum
China Civil Aviation Museum
China Museum of Telecommunications
China National Film Museum
China National Post and Postage Stamp Museum
China Numismatic Museum
China Printing Museum
China Railway Museum
China Science and Technology Museum
Dabaotai Western Han Dynasty Mausoleum
Digital Beijing Building
Geological Museum of China
Guanfu Museum (private)
International Friendship Museum
Lu Xun Museum
Military Museum of the Chinese People's Revolution
Ming City Wall Relics Park
Museum of the War of Chinese People's Resistance Against Japanese Aggression
National Art Museum of China
National Museum of China
Palace Museum (Forbidden City)
Paleozoological Museum of China
Shangyuan Art Museum
Western Zhou Yan State Capital Museum
Madame Tussauds Beijing

Chongqing
Baiheliang Underwater Museum
Chongqing Art Museum
Chongqing Museum of Natural History
Chongqing Science and Technology Museum
Chongqing Sichuan Opera Museum
General Joseph W. Stilwell Museum
Red Rock Village Museum
Three Gorges Museum
Madame Tussauds Chongqing

Fujian
Fujian Museum, Fuzhou
Guanfu Museum (private), Xiamen
Jinjiang Museum, Jinjiang
Quanzhou Museum
Quanzhou Maritime Museum, which houses the Quanzhou ship

Gansu
Dunhuang County Museum
Gansu Provincial Museum (Lanzhou)
Lanzhou Museum (Lanzhou)
Silk Route Museum

Guangdong
 Dongguan Science and Technology Museum
 Guangdong Museum, Guangzhou
 Guangdong Museum of Art, Guangzhou
 Guangdong Museum of Revolutionary History
 Guangdong Provincial Museum, Guangzhou
 Longgang Museum of Hakka Culture, Longgang
 Museum of the Mausoleum of the Nanyue King, Guangzhou
 Shenzhen Museum, Shenzhen
 Wangye Museum, Shenzhen

Guangxi
Guangxi Museum
Anthropology Museum Of Guangxi 
Liuzhou Museum
Museum of Guihai Tablets Forest

Guizhou

Hainan
Hainan Provincial Museum

Hebei
Hebei Provincial Museum

Heilongjiang
 Heilongjiang Provincial Museum

Henan
Henan Museum, Zhengzhou
Luoyang Museum, Luoyang
Guo State Museum, Sanmenxia

Hong Kong SAR

Hubei
Hubei Provincial Museum
Wuhan Museum
Underground Project 131, in Xianning Prefecture
Yifu Museum of China University of Geosciences
Madame Tussauds Wuhan

Hunan
 Hunan Provincial Museum, Changsha
 Changsha Museum, Changsha
 Changsha Bamboo Slips Museum, Changsha
 Qin Dynasty Bamboo Slips Museum of Liye, Longshan County

Inner Mongolia
Inner Mongolia Museum, Hohhot
Hohhot City Museum, Hohhot

Jiangsu

Nanjing

China Modern History Museum, Nanjing
Nanjing Museum
Nanjing Municipal Museum
Nanjing Massacre Memorial Hall, Nanjing
Taiping Heavenly Kingdom History Museum, Nanjing

Suzhou
Suzhou Museum
Suzhou Arts and Crafts Museum
Changzhou Museum, Suzhou
Zhenjiang Museum, Suzhou
Yangzhou Museum and China Block Printing Museum (the two are locally known as the "double museum", as they share the lobby section), Suzhou

Xuzhou
Xuzhou Museum
Xuzhou Decree Museum
Cultural Site of Han Dynasty
Lion Hill Chu Prince Mausoleum
Aquatic Terracotta Warrior Museum
Museum of Terra Cotta Warriors and Horses of The Han Dynasty
Han Dynasty Stone Relief Gallery
Han Dynasty Cultural and Artistic Museum

Other cities
The Museum of Guangling King's Tomb in Han Dynasty, Yangzhou
Nantong Museum, Nantong
The Old Museum of Wisteria, Changzhou
Red Army Memorial Museum, Rugao

Jiangxi
Jiujiang British Concession Museum
Jiujiang Museum
Jiujiang Folk Culture Museum
Jiujiang Urban Planning Exhibition Centre
Jiujiang Fine Arts Museum
Jiujiang Forest Museum

Jilin
Museum of the Imperial Palace of the Manchu State, Changchun
 Jilin Provincial Museum
Jilin University Museum

Liaoning
Liaoning Provincial Museum
Dalian Natural History Museum
Dalian Modern Museum
Shenyang Steam Locomotive Museum

Macau
 Communications Museum
 Fire Services Museum
 Grand Prix Museum
 Macao Tea Culture House
 Macau Museum of Art
 Macau Wine Museum
 Maritime Museum
 Museum of Macau
 Museum of Sacred Art and Crypt
 Museum of Taipa and Coloane History
 Natural and Agrarian Museum
 Sun Yat Sen Memorial House
 Taipa Houses-Museum

Ningxia
 Ningxia Museum

Qinghai
Liuwan Museum of Ancient Painted Pottery, Ledu

Shaanxi
Shaanxi History Museum, Xi'an
Xi'an Stele Forest Museum (Beilin), Xi'an
Terracotta Army, Xi'an
Xi'an Banpo Museum, Xi'an
Maoling Museum, Xianyang
Xi'an Museum (within grounds of Jianfu Temple), Xi'an
Xianyang Museum, Xianyang
Baoji Bronzeware Museum, Baoji

Shandong
 Shandong Art Museum
 Shandong Provincial Museum
 Shandong Science & Technology Museum
 Jinan Museum
 Qingdao Municipal Museum

Shanghai

 Aurora Art Museum 
 China Art Museum
 China Maritime Museum
 C. Y. Tung Maritime Museum
 Museum of Contemporary Art Shanghai
 Power Station of Art
 Rockbund Art Museum
 Shanghai Entomological Museum
 Shanghai Film Museum
 Shanghai History Museum
 Shanghai International Wine & Spirits Museum
 Shanghai Jewish Refugees Museum
 Shanghai Mazu Cultural Palace
 Shanghai Museum
 Shanghai Museum of Public Security
 Shanghai Museum of Traditional Chinese Medicine
 Shanghai Natural History Museum
 Shanghai Science and Technology Museum
 Shanghai Urban Planning Exhibition Center
 Shanghai Water Displaying Hall
 Long Museum
 Guangfulin Relics Park
 Madame Tussauds Shanghai

Shanxi
Shanxi Provincial Museum (Taiyuan)
Shanxi Provincial Museum of Art (Taiyuan)
Datong Museum (Lower Huayan Monastery of Datong)
The Coal Museum of China (Taiyuan)

Sichuan
Zigong Dinosaur Museum, Zigong
Zigong Salt History Museum, Zigong
Sichuan Science and Technology Museum, Chengdu
Du Fu Cao Tang (Thatched Cottage of Du Fu), Chengdu
Sanxingdui Museum
Jinsha Site Museum
China Colour Lantern Museum
Jianchuan Museum

Tianjin
Tianjin Museum
Memorial to Zhou Enlai and Deng Yingchao, Tianjin
Tianjin Natural History Museum
Tianjin Museum of Modern History

Tibet Autonomous Region
 Tibet Museum

Xinjiang
 Xinjiang Uyghur Autonomous Region Museum
 Khotan Cultural Museum
 Turpan Museum

Yunnan
Lufeng Dinosaur Museum
Yunnan Provincial Museum
Yunnan Nationalities Museum
Kunming Natural History Museum of Zoology
Yunnan Railway Museum Kunming.

Zhejiang
Zhejiang Provincial Museum, Hangzhou
Zhejiang Museum of Natural History
Hangzhou Southern Song Dynasty Guan Kiln Museum
Hangzhou World Numismatic Museum
Liangzhu Culture Museum
China National Tea Museum, Hangzhou
China National Silk Museum, Hangzhou
Zhoushan Museum
China Finance and Taxation Museum
China Shoes Museum, Wenzhou
China Grand Canal Museum
The National Sauce Culture Museum of China
Traditional Chinese Medicine Museum, Hangzhou
Chinese Seal Museum, Hangzhou

See also
 Libraries in China
 List of universities in China
 List of World Heritage Sites in China
 List of tourist attractions in China

References

External links

 Museums in China (English, by chinaculture.org)
 Museums in China overview
 China Museums directory 
 China Museums Guide
 Beijing's Museums & Galleries - China.org.cn
 Chinese Museums with English language websites
 "China to Have 3,000 Museums by 2015"
 "Another 1,200 museums open for free by 2009"
 Nanjing's Museums & Galleries - TheNanjinger.com
 China Museum Index
 10 Popular Museums worth Visiting on Your China Tour

 
 
Museums
Museums
Educational organizations based in China